Arthur Coates may refer to:

Arthur Coates (cricketer) (1848–1897), English cricketer who played for Gloucestershire
Arthur Coates (footballer) (1882–1955), English footballer who played for Exeter City and Southampton in the 1910s